Nyáregyháza is a village in Pest county, Hungary.

References 

Populated places in Pest County